Victor Heflin (born July 7, 1960) is a former American football defensive back who played two seasons with the St. Louis Cardinals of the National Football League (NFL). He was drafted by the Denver Broncos in the sixth round of the 1983 NFL Draft. He played college football at Delaware State University and attended Wayne High School in Huber Heights, Ohio.

He is the brother of former NFL player Vince Heflin.

References

External links
Just Sports Stats

Living people
1960 births
Players of American football from Massachusetts
American football defensive backs
African-American players of American football
Delaware State Hornets football players
St. Louis Cardinals (football) players
Sportspeople from Springfield, Massachusetts
People from Huber Heights, Ohio
21st-century African-American people
20th-century African-American sportspeople